The Sharjah American International School, Sharjah (SAIS Sharjah) is situated on a  piece of land located in Sharjah, UAE, near Al Wasit Area.

Curriculum
Sharjah American International School provides an American-based curriculum within the framework of traditional Islamic values. It is SAIS's overriding belief that students learn to their optimum in a caring, nurturing environment which recognizes the importance of the local culture and traditions.

External links 
Sharjah website
High Scope curriculum website
MAP - Measures of Academic Progress
Lexile Reading Framework
Scholastic Reading Inventory
The Leader in Me
http://www.eblocks.net/en/principal/index.php/E-Blocks

Schools in Sharjah (city)
Educational institutions established in 1997
1997 establishments in the United Arab Emirates